Spharagemon is a genus of band-winged grasshoppers in the family Acrididae. There are about 9 described species in Spharagemon.

Species
 Spharagemon bolli Scudder, 1875 (Boll's grasshopper)
 Spharagemon bunites Otte, 1984
 Spharagemon campestris (McNeill, 1901) (campestral grasshopper)
 Spharagemon collare (Scudder, 1872) (mottled sand grasshopper)
 Spharagemon crepitans (Saussure, 1884) (crepitating grasshopper)
 Spharagemon cristatum Scudder, 1875 (ridgeback grasshopper)
 Spharagemon equale (Say, 1825) (Say's grasshopper)
 Spharagemon marmorata (Harris, 1841)
 Spharagemon saxatile Morse, 1894 (ledge grasshopper)

References

Further reading

 
 

Oedipodinae